Alexander Donat, also Aleksander Donat in Polish (1905 – 16 June 1983), was a Holocaust survivor imprisoned at the Lodz Ghetto and several Nazi concentration camps during the occupation of Poland by Nazi Germany in World War II. After the war, Donat, a chemist by training and journalist by profession, emigrated with his family to the United States, settling in New York City. As an eye witness to the Holocaust in Poland, he went on to write about his wartime experiences, collect documents, and publish the narratives of others.

Biography
Alexander Donat was born Michał Berg in the Polish capital Warsaw, where he lived until World War II. He was a publisher of a daily newspaper there, had married, and became a father in 1937 to a son William. Following the Nazi German invasion of Poland Berg (Donat) and his family were forced into the Warsaw Ghetto. From there, he was deported to several slave labor and concentration camps including Majdanek. Michał Berg have met a prisoner whose real name was Alexander Donat at Vaihingen concentration camp. They secretly agreed to switch their names for a prisoner transport. Soon thereafter the real Alexander Donat was murdered. Berg decided to keep Donat's name as his own forever. Donat feared that, "should the Nazis be victorious, 'future generations will pay trubute to them'" similar to Homeric Greek crusaders. He was liberated from Dachau by American troops and returned to Warsaw, where he found his wife and their son, whom the Polish rescuers had placed in a Catholic orphanage. The Donats went to the United States and opened a printing business.

In 1977, Donat helped start "The Holocaust Library", a non-profit program to launch books that condemn persecution and tell of the personal experiences of the Jews during the Second World War. He died of a lung disease at Mount Sinai Hospital in New York City.

His son William Donat was a noted publisher, President of Waldon Press, and a graphic artist. He died on November 5, 2009.

Publications
Jewish Resistance (1964)
Holocaust Kingdom (1965)
The Death Camp Treblinka: a documentary (1979)

Notes

References
 Barbara Engelking, Jacek Leociak: The Warsaw Ghetto: A Guide to the Perished City. Yale University Press (Google Books preview). Retrieved 
 Joshua D. Zimmerman: Contested Memories: Poles and Jews During the Holocaust and Its Aftermath Rutgers University Press. Retrieved  
 Henryk Grynberg: "My, Żydzi z Dobrego" Kanadyjska Fundacja Dziedzictwa Polsko-Żydowskiego, Montreal. Retrieved 

1905 births
1983 deaths
Jewish American journalists
Majdanek concentration camp survivors
Warsaw Ghetto inmates
Polish emigrants to the United States
Vaihingen an der Enz concentration camp survivors
20th-century American Jews